Moox Live was a Norwegian television channel in 2006–2007 with user-generated content. The viewers could vote for music videos, watch interviews with celebrities and discuss topics such as movies, fashion, celebrities, sex and love. It was taken off the air after less than one year.

References
Legger ned Moox Live

Television channels and stations established in 2006
Television channels and stations disestablished in 2007
Defunct television channels in Norway